Cleoceris is a genus of moths of the family Noctuidae.

Species
 Cleoceris scoriacea (Esper, 1789)

References
 Cleoceris at Markku Savela's Lepidoptera and Some Other Life Forms
 Natural History Museum Lepidoptera genus database

Cuculliinae